Siyana Vasileva (born 3 March 1996) is an Azerbaijani group rhythmic gymnast. She is the 2014 European 3 Balls + 2 Ribbons silver and the 2016 European 3 Balls + 2 Ropes bronze medalist.

Career

Senior
She competed at the 2018 World Championships in Sofia, Bulgaria, where she placed 7th in Group All-around competition. She was also a part of the group that took 8th place in All-around at the 2019 World Championships in Baku, Azerbaijan.

In 2021, she was elected FIG Athletes Representative in Rhythmic Gymnastics, as the successor to Liubou Charkashyna (BLR), who had been the athlete's representative of the World Gymnastics Federation for Rhythmic Gymnastics since 2013.

Personal life
She is a daughter of Azerbaijani rhythmic gymnastics coach Mariana Vasileva.

References

External links 
 
 

1996 births
Living people
Azerbaijani rhythmic gymnasts
European Games competitors for Azerbaijan
Gymnasts at the 2015 European Games